Pierrot Lunaire  is a melodrama by Arnold Schoenberg.

Pierrot Lunaire may also refer to:

 Pierrot lunaire (book), the cycle of poems by Albert Giraud
 Pierrot Lunaire (band), the Italian band
 Pierrot Lunaire (film), a 2014 film